Orlando Rubén Bordón, (born 7 August 1986 in Asunción) is a football midfielder from Paraguay, who currently plays for CD Comercio in the Torneo Argentino B.

Career
Bordón started his career in the youth divisions of Olimpia and made his professional debut in 2008 under coach Gustavo Costas. In the first half of 2014 Bordón played for FC Jūrmala in the Latvian Higher League. Bordón also has been called to the Under-23 Paraguay national football team in several occasions.

References

External links
 Orlando Bordón at BDFA.com.ar 

1986 births
Living people
People from Capiatá
Paraguayan footballers
Club Olimpia footballers
Club Nacional footballers
Paraguayan expatriate footballers
Expatriate footballers in Argentina
Expatriate footballers in Latvia
FC Jūrmala players
Association football midfielders